Qeshlaq-e Gomar (also Romanized as Qeshlāq-e Gomār) is a village in Hegmataneh Rural District, in the Central District of Hamadan County, Hamadan Province, Iran. At the 2006 census, its population was 52, in 10 families.

References 

Populated places in Hamadan County